Cimicoidea is the name of a superfamily of insects belonging to the infraorder Cimicomorpha, including bedbugs and related families.

References 

Cimicomorpha
Hemiptera superfamilies